The Best Horror of the Year: Volume Three is a horror fiction anthology edited by Ellen Datlow that was published on June 1, 2011. It is the third in The Best Horror of the Year series.

Contents
The book includes 21 stories and one poem, all first published in 2010. The book includes a summation by Datlow of 2010 publications in the horror fiction market, and a list of honorable mentions for the year. The stories are as follows:

Cody Goodfellow: "At the Riding School"
Reggie Oliver: "Mr. Pigsny"
John Langan: "City of the Dog"
Brian Hodge: "Just Outside Our Windows, Deep Inside Our Walls"
Norman Partridge: "Lesser Demons"
Karina Sumner-Smith: "When the Zombies Win"
Laird Barron: "--30--"
Mark Morris: "Fallen Boys"
M. Rickert: "Was She Wicked? Was She Good?"
Richard Harland: "The Fear"
Stephen Graham Jones: "Till the Morning Comes"
Glen Hirshberg: "Shomer"
Christopher Fowler: "Oh I Do Like to Be Beside the Seaside"
Nicholas Royle: "The Obscure Bird"
Richard Christian Matheson: "Transfiguration"
Catherynne M. Valente: "The Days of Flaming Motorcycles"
Joe R. Lansdale: "The Folding Man"
Joseph S. Pulver, Sr.: "Just Another Desert Night with Blood" (poem)
Tanith Lee: "Black and White Sky"
Ray Cluley: "At Night, When the Demons Come"
John Langan: "The Revel"

External links
 
Book review by David Marshall at Thinking about Books

2011 anthologies
Horror anthologies
Night Shade Books books